Shilhak-inshushinak (Šilḫak-Inšušinak I)  (means powered by inshushinak) was king of Elam from about 1150 to 1120 BC and a king of the Shutrukid Dynasty. 

When he replaced his older brother, Kutir-nahhunte he became the last great king of Elam. He married the widow of his brother Queen Nahhunte-utu and had 8 children. 

He waged wars with Babylonia, much like his immediate predecessors.

He ruled for thirty years and many inscriptions have remained of him.

Sources 
Hinz, W. (1964). Das Reich Elam, Kohl-hammer, Stuttgart.

Elamite kings
Shuturukid dynasty